Zoltán Szabó (1882 -1944) was a Hungarian botanist, geneticist, and professor. He was a full member of the Hungarian Academy of Sciences. His work covered many areas of botany, including plant taxonomy, plant morphology and anatomy, plant geography and floristics, agrobotany and mycology, but he achieved his most significant results in genetic research. In the taxonomic literature his name abbreviation is "Szabó".

Career 
Szabó entered the Eötvös Loránd University in 1900, and obtained his doctorate at the University of Breslau in 1905, where he was assistant professor in the Department of Botany from 1905 to 1905..  From 1905 to 1941 he held posts at Eötvös Loránd University, Budapest University of Technology and Economics, the Royal Hungarian Veterinary College, and Pázmány Péter Catholic University.. 

Sazbo was a member of the Hungarian Academy of Sciences, the Royal Hungarian Society of Natural Sciences, the  Hungarian Psychological Society. He was awarded the  Corvin Wreath in 1941.

Major publications 

 Monographie der Gattung ″Knautia″ Inaugural-Dissertation). Budapest: Akadémia. 1911.
 Útmutató növények gyűjtésére, konzerválására, növénygyűjtemények berendezésére és növénytani megfigyelésre. Budapest: Királyi Magyar Természettudományi Társulat. 1913.
 A növények szervezete: Az általános növénytan elemei. Budapest: Centrum. 1922.
 A növények életmódja. Budapest: Szent István Társulat. 1925.
 A szobai növények élete és gondozása. Budapest: Királyi Magyar Természettudományi Társulat. 1928.
 A kromoszóma. Budapest: Királyi Magyar Természettudományi Társulat. 1936.
 Az átöröklés: Az általános örökléstudomány elemei figyelemmel a gazdasági és orvosi vonatkozásokra. Budapest: Királyi Magyar Természettudományi Társulat. 1938.
 A Cephalaria-génusz monográfiája. Budapest: Magyar Tudományos Akadémia. 1940.
 A sejt szerkezete és élete. Budapest: Egyetemi ny. 1941. (Entz Gézával)
 Származás és öröklődés. Budapest: Magyar Szemle Társaság. 1942.

References 

 Magyar életrajzi lexikon II. (L–Z). Főszerk. Kenyeres Ágnes. Budapest: Akadémiai. 1969. 686.
 Magyar agrártörténeti életrajzok III. (R–Zs). Szerk. Für Lajos, Pintér János. Budapest: Magyar Mezőgazdasági Múzeum. 1989. 290–292. o. ISBN 963-7092-06-4
 Magyar tudóslexikon A-tól Zs-ig. Főszerk. Nagy Ferenc. Budapest: Better; MTESZ; OMIKK. 1997. 742–743. o. ISBN 963-85433-5-3
 Magyarország a XX. században IV.: Tudomány – Műszaki és természettudományok. Főszerk. Kollega Tarsoly István. Szekszárd: Babits. 1999. 482–483.
 Magyar nagylexikon XVI. (Sel–Szö). Főszerk. Bárány Lászlóné. Budapest: Magyar Nagylexikon. 2003.  ISBN 963-9257-15-X
 A Magyar Tudományos Akadémia tagjai 1825–2002 III. (R–ZS). Főszerk. Glatz Ferenc. Budapest: MTA Társadalomkutató Központ. 2003. 1188–1189.
 Új magyar életrajzi lexikon VI. (Sz–Zs). Főszerk. Markó László. Budapest: Helikon. 2007. 81–82.  ISBN 963-547-414-8

Sources 

1882 births
1944 deaths
Eötvös Loránd University alumni
University of Breslau alumni
Academic staff of the University of Breslau
Academic staff of Pázmány Péter Catholic University
Academic staff of the Budapest University of Technology and Economics
20th-century Hungarian botanists
Hungarian mycologists
Hungarian geneticists